Varympompi or Varibobi is a suburb of Athens in the municipality of Acharnes, East Attica, Greece.

Geography

The Olympic Village of the 2004 Summer Olympics is 3 km southwest of Varympompi. The Varympompi cliffs, northwest of the village, are a well-established rock climbing area.

History
Varympompi has historically been an Arvanite settlement.

Historical population

See also
Communities of Attica

References

External links
rockclimbing.com

Populated places in East Attica
Acharnes
Arvanite settlements